Vánoční koleda (Christmas Carol) is an EP by Slovak  vocalist Szidi Tobias released on Studio DVA in 2011.

Track listing

Credits and personnel
 Szidi Tobias – lead vocal
 Milan Vyskočáni – music
 Peter Lipovský – lyrics
 Michal Hrubý – producer
 Lucie Robinson – photography

References

General
 
 
Specific

External links 
 Vánoční koleda (official website)
 SzidiTobias.cz > Discography > Vánoční koleda on Discogs

2011 EPs
Szidi Tobias EPs